The ACC Twenty20 Cup was a 20-over cricket tournament organised by the Asian Cricket Council (ACC). The tournament did not include the ACC members who were full members of the International Cricket Council (ICC) during the years in which it was held (Bangladesh, India, Pakistan, and Sri Lanka), instead featuring the best associate and affiliate members. Matches at the tournament were not accorded official Twenty20 or Twenty20 International status.

The inaugural ACC Twenty20 Cup in 2007 was jointly won by Afghanistan and Oman. From 2011, the tournament has been part of the qualification process for the ICC World Twenty20. The four top-ranked teams at the 2011 and 2013 tournaments qualified for the next World Twenty20 Qualifier. At the 2013 Qualifier (for the 2014 main tournament), the four ACC teams all gained Twenty20 International status and automatic qualification for the 2015 Qualifier (for the 2016 main tournament). Consequently, those teams were excluded from the 2015 ACC Twenty20 Cup, with only the winner (Oman) qualifying for the 2016 Qualifier.

2007 ACC Twenty20 Cup

The 2007 tournament took place from 27 October until 2 November in Kuwait. Ten teams participated in the tournament.

The final between Afghanistan and Oman was tied after 20 overs each. Tournament regulations stated that a Bowl-out was to be used in the event of a tie, but due to the poor condition of the pitch after the match, it was cancelled and the trophy shared.

2009 ACC Twenty20 Cup

A second tournament was held in November 2009, featuring all but the bottom two teams from the 2007 tournament. The cricket team from Afghanistan was the winner again. The top three teams from the 2009 tournament joined Bangladesh, Pakistan and Sri Lanka for the cricket tournament at the 2010 Asian Games.

2011 ACC Twenty20 Cup

A third tournament was held in December 2011, featuring ten teams. The cricket team from Afghanistan was the winner for the third time. The top three teams from the 2011 tournament will head to the UAE to participate in the 2012 ICC World Twenty20 Qualifier.

2013 ACC Twenty20 Cup

A fourth tournament was held between March 26- April 3 in Nepal, featuring ten teams. The cricket team from Afghanistan was the winner for the fourth time. Nepal, Hong Kong qualified for the 2013 ICC World Twenty20 Qualifier in addition to Afghanistan as an ODI nation and UAE as hosts.

2015 ACC Twenty20 Cup

The 2015 edition of the tournament was held in the United Arab Emirates in early 2015.  The tournament, won by Oman, served as a qualifying tournament for the 2015 ICC World Twenty20 Qualifier, to be held in Ireland and Scotland. Afghanistan, Hong Kong, Nepal and the United Arab Emirates did not play in the tournament as their T20I status had already placed them in the 2015 World Twenty20 Qualifier.

Results summary

Participating teams
Legend
 – Champions
 – Runners-up
 – Third place
Q – Qualified
 * – Team was ineligible for tournament
 — Hosts

See also
ACC Premier League
ACC Championship
ICC World Twenty20 Qualifier

References

External links
Asian Cricket Council Official website

 
Twenty20 International cricket competitions
Asian Cricket Council competitions
Recurring sporting events established in 2007